"Give Blood" is a song by Pete Townshend, the guitarist for The Who. The song is the opening track for Townshend's fourth solo album, a concept album titled White City: A Novel, and was released as a single. "Give Blood" features Pink Floyd guitarist David Gilmour. He also appears on another song from the album, "White City Fighting", the music for which was written by Gilmour.

When Townshend was asked about the song he said:

Cash Box said that the song was "strong paean toworld peace."

The single failed to chart in UK or to make the Billboard Hot 100 US Pop Chart, but reached number 5 on Billboards Mainstream Rock Charts.

The song was used to encourage blood donation on June 14, 2021 on World Blood Donor Day.

Charts

References

1986 singles
1985 songs
Atco Records singles
Pete Townshend songs
Songs written by Pete Townshend
Song recordings produced by Chris Thomas (record producer)